Aaron Zigman (born January 6, 1963) is a classically-trained American composer, producer, arranger, songwriter, and musician who has scored music for films including The Notebook, The Company Men, Bridge to Terabithia, John Q., The Proposal, Flicka, For Colored Girls, Flash of Genius, Sex & the City, Alpha Dog, and Escape from Planet Earth. He has also written, arranged and produced over 50 hit albums, and co-written songs with legendary and contemporary artists including Quincy Jones, Christina Aguilera, Phil Collins, Was (Not Was), John Legend, Dionne Warwick, Ray Charles, Natalie Cole, Aretha Franklin, Tina Turner, and Seal.

Early life and career
Zigman was born in San Diego, California. His mother, a pianist and harpist, was his first music teacher, and he developed an early interest in jazz and concert music, studying with Rocky Slight, Gene Hartwell (a San Diego jazz player), and Florence Stephenson. A graduate of Point Loma High School, he studied at the University of California, Los Angeles.

While still in college, Zigman had a contract with Almo/Irving Music Publishing, wrote songs for Carly Simon and the television show Fame, and co-wrote with David Lasley, Jerry Knight, and Steve Cropper. In 1983, he began studying with his cousin George Bassman (who orchestrated The Wizard of Oz and wrote the music for the films Marty and The Postman Always Rings Twice). Bassman had also penned the Tommy Dorsey Classic, "Getting Sentimental Over You", was the musical arranger for Lena Horne and Benny Goodman, and orchestrated for Andre Kostelanetz.

In the 1980s, Zigman began to make a name for himself as a studio musician and wrote the pop music hits "Crush On You," "Curiosity," and "Private Number," top chart records for The Jets. He then worked for Clive Davis, and produced and arranged for Aretha Franklin and Natalie Cole. During this time he wrote, arranged, and produced songs for many of the top singers and artists in the industry such as Ray Charles, Phil Collins, Dionne Warwick, Boz Scaggs, Tina Turner, Seal, Carly Simon, the Pointer Sisters, Jermaine Stewart,  Huey Lewis, Jennifer Holliday, Patti LaBelle, Chicago, Natalie Cole, and Christina Aguilera.

In the 1990s, he entered the film industry, with his producing, arranging, orchestration, and pianistic work being featured on soundtracks for Mulan, What's Love Got to Do With It?, The Birdcage, Licence to Kill, and Pocahontas.

His first film score was for the 2002 film John Q., which won a BMI Film Music Award. This led to his first major television score, for the 2004 Showtime production Crown Heights, and to his first film score for a major motion picture The Notebook, for which he won multiple BMI Awards.

In March 2020, Billie Eilish revealed 32 songs which inspired her Grammy-winning album When We All Fall Asleep Where Do We Go?. "Jesse's Bridge," a song composed by Zigman from his soundtrack for the Disney movie Bridge to Terabithia, was listed as one of the inspirations for Eilish's ILOMILO.

Concert music 
Zigman has composed both chamber and full orchestral works on commission, including a viola sonata; a 1994 tone poem Rabin: An Orchestral Work in Five Movements (premiered at Los Angeles' Westside Pavilion on December 25, 1997, repeated in Spring 1999 by the Los Angeles Jewish Symphony under the direction of Noreen Green in memory of Yitzhak Rabin, and recorded live on the Bernard Milken Jewish Community Campus in March 1999); Martyrology: A Tribute to Those Who Have Died in the Face of Persecution; Impressions, a 2004 suite for wind ensemble (premiered by Richard Todd and the USC Symphony Orchestra); Vis Vitae (mixed octet, featured at the historic Beverly Hills Presbyterian Church on Rodeo Drive as part of the "Voices of Hollywood" concert at the Third Annual Beverly Hills International Music Festival in 2006 and in Zigman's score for Flash of Genius; No Strings Attached, a 2007 horn sextet for Brian O' Connor (1951-2016) at UCLA; and a Rhapsody for Cello and Piano (premiered/recorded in 2015 by Andrew Shulman and Robert Thies).

His vocal music includes a setting of Shir L'Shalom (also recorded live on the Bernard Milken Jewish Community Campus in March 1999); two Ave Maria vocalises (one written with bassist Abraham Laboriel Sr., composed as the main title song for the film Virgin of Juarez and one written for the main title song of the film John Q, featuring Joshua Bell on violin); an Emmy Award-winning setting of the Hebrew prayer for peaceSim Shalom (from the Showtime TV film Crown Heights, with Alex Brown); and an Italian aria with chorus (La Donna in Viola, setting a translation of Ntozake Shange's poem "Pyramid", for 3 soprano soloists and SSAAT choir, also featuring Joshua Bell) featured in the film For Colored Girls (2009-2010).

For the soundtrack for the 2016 dramatic film Wakefield, French classical pianist Jean-Yves Thibaudet contributed piano work to Zigman's film score. This was the first time another pianist performed his film work. Zigman had first visited Beijing while working on the film score for Chinese movie Hidden Man, directed by Wen Jiang. Hidden Man was China's entry for Best Foreign Language Film at the 91st Academy Awards.
The Tango Manos concerto project was suggested to Jean-Yves Thibaudet and Aaron Zigman by Yu Long, renowned conductor and Chairman of the Beijing Music Festival. Zigman created a three-movement concerto for piano and orchestra, dedicating it to Thibaudet, who premiered the work under Huang Yi's direction with the China Philharmonic at the Beijing Music Festival, October 14, 2019.
Zigman attended the October 13, 2019 press conference for the 22nd Beijing Music Festival in Beijing, China. Tango Manos was one of three works written for the Beijing Music Festival, co-commissioned by the China Philharmonic, Radio France and the San Francisco Symphony. The event was of cultural significance, taking place in Jingshan Park, in front of Shouhuang Hall.

Jean-Yves Thibaudet played the US premiere of Tango Manos with the San Francisco Symphony in a multi-concert series under the direction of Fabien Gabel, beginning on February 14, 2020. The work was nominated for the 2021 Pulitzer Prize in Music and is a National Finalist for the American Prize in Composition (Professional Division, Orchestral Works). Zigman's Rhapsody for Cello and Piano will be premiered in the Baker-Baum Concert Hall at the La Jolla Music Society by Alisa Weilerstein and Inon Barnatan on August 15, 2021.

Filmography

Film

2000s

2010s

2020s

Television

References

External links

 

1963 births
Living people
20th-century American composers
20th-century American male musicians
21st-century American composers
21st-century American male musicians
American film score composers
American male film score composers
American television composers
Male television composers
Musicians from San Diego
Point Loma High School alumni
Record producers from California
Songwriters from California
University of California, Los Angeles alumni
Varèse Sarabande Records artists